The Governor L. G. Hardman House is a historic house located at 208 Elm Street in Commerce, Georgia. It is locally significant architecturally as a "fine example" in Georgia of the Mediterranean Revival style of architecture applied to a residence.

Description and history 
Completed in 1921, the house was designed by architect Leroy C. Hart in Mediterranean Revival architecture, one variety of Late 19th and 20th Century Revivals architecture. It was originally built as the home of Georgia governor Lamartine Griffin Hardman (1856–1937), who governed during 1927–1931. The  listing included two contributing buildings. It was listed on the National Register of Historic Places on June 16, 1988.

References

External links
Historic site marker for the house

Houses on the National Register of Historic Places in Georgia (U.S. state)
Houses completed in 1921
Houses in Jackson County, Georgia
Mediterranean Revival architecture
National Register of Historic Places in Jackson County, Georgia
Governor of Georgia (U.S. state)